Catherine Schell (born Katherina Freiin Schell von Bauschlott, 17 July 1944) is a Hungarian-born actress who came to prominence in British film and television productions from the 1960s. Her notable roles include the Bond girl Nancy in On Her Majesty's Secret Service (1969), Lady Claudine Litton in The Return of the Pink Panther (1975), Countess Scarlioni in the Doctor Who serial City of Death (1979), and a regular role as Maya in Series Two of the television series Space: 1999 (1975).

Early life
Schell's father, Baron Paul Schell von Bauschlott, was a Hungarian diplomat of three-quarter Magyar ancestry; her mother was Countess Katharina Maria Etelka Georgina Elisabeth Teleki de Szék. "Schell" is the family name, while "von Bauschlott" indicates the place in Germany where the Schell family owned its main estate.

Fleeing Hungary in advance of the Soviets and communism, the family lived in poverty until 1948, finding asylum in Austria: first in Vienna, then in Salzburg. In 1950, the family emigrated to the United States, where Schell's father acquired American citizenship.

Schell entered a convent school in the New York City borough of Staten Island. In 1957, her father joined Radio Free Europe and the family moved to Munich where Schell developed an interest in acting and attended the Otto Falckenberg School of the Performing Arts.

Career

Film

She acted under the alternate names "Catherine von Schell", "Catherina von Schell", and "Katherina von Schell" early in her career. Under the latter name, she made her film debut as the title character in the little-known German-language film Lana, Queen of the Amazons (1964). She appeared as Bond girl Nancy in the James Bond film On Her Majesty's Secret Service (1969), with George Lazenby in the lead. Around the same time, she appeared in Hammer Films science-fiction thriller Moon Zero Two (also 1969) cast in the role of Clementine Taplin. She appeared with Bette Davis, now credited as Catherine Schell, in Madame Sin (1972), a television film made by ITC which was released theatrically in some markets.

Schell appeared opposite Peter Sellers in the comedy The Return of the Pink Panther (1975) as Lady Claudine Lytton. Schell appeared with Sellers again in The Prisoner of Zenda (1979), one of his last films.

Television
Schell's first TV credit was Till Eulenspiegel (1967), a West German comedy in which she played Nele and was billed as Katherina von Schell.

Schell spent much of her career in British television, appearing in more than 47 series spanning a period of nearly 30 years. She played regular roles in series such as The Adventurer, Looking For Clancy, One by One, Mog and Wish Me Luck, in addition to many guest appearances, including The Persuaders! (starring alongside future James Bond  actor Roger Moore), The Troubleshooters, Arthur of the Britons, Return of the Saint, The Sweeney, The Onedin Line, The Gentle Touch, Lovejoy, Bergerac, The Bill, Howards' Way and The Search for the Nile.

Schell appeared in the science-fiction series Space: 1999 as a robotic servant ("Guardian of Piri", 1975), and returned to the series in its second season as the regular character Maya, a shape-shifting "metamorph" from the planet Psychon. Schell appeared in another British science-fiction series, as Countess Scarlioni in the Doctor Who serial City of Death (1979).

Personal life

Family
Schell's brother, Paul Rudolf (born 1940), now known as Paul von Schell, has acted in German-language productions. A younger brother, Peter (1941–68), died young. Through a German great-grandfather, Schell is related to Louis XIV of France (1638–1715), Philip II, Duke of Orléans (1674–1723), Regent of France and Francis I, Holy Roman Emperor (1708–65). She is not believed to be related to the Austrian-Swiss actors Maximilian and Maria Schell.

Marriages
While filming Amsterdam Affair in 1968, Schell met and married her first husband, British actor William Marlowe (1930–2003), and moved to London. The marriage ended in divorce in 1977. Schell married director Bill Hays (1938–2006) in 1982. In 1984, they worked together for the first time as husband and wife on a TV production of Ivan Turgenev's play A Month in the Country.

Retirement
Schell's career continued into the mid-1990s, after which she retired from acting and opened Chambre d'Hôtes Valentin, a small guesthouse in Bonneval, Haute-Loire, France, which would become a popular destination for fans of Space: 1999. She reportedly sold the inn after the death of her second husband in 2006.

Schell made her first convention appearance at MainMission:2000, a celebration of the 25th anniversary of Space: 1999 held in New York City. To date, she has appeared at only one other convention, mainly due to her second husband's declining health.

Schell contributed a foreword to the Space: 1999 novel Born for Adversity, written by David McIntee and published by Powys Media in 2010.

Schell's autobiography  A Constant Alien was published in 2016.

She subsequently came out of acting retirement to portray the Grand Duchess Valeria in the BBC One/Netflix series Dracula, which aired in 2020.

Filmography

Film

Television

References

External links
 
 
 

1944 births
Living people
20th-century British actresses
20th-century Hungarian actresses
21st-century British actresses
Actresses from Budapest
British film actresses
British hoteliers
British television actresses
Hungarian emigrants to Austria
Hungarian emigrants to the United Kingdom
Hungarian emigrants to the United States
Hungarian film actresses
Hungarian nobility
Hungarian people of French descent
Hungarian people of German descent
Hungarian refugees
Hungarian television actresses
British emigrants to France
Hungarian emigrants to France
Hungarian emigrants to Germany
Naturalised citizens of the United Kingdom
British people of German descent
British people of French descent